Thylacinus yorkellus is a fossil species of carnivorous marsupial, a sister species of the recently extinct Thylacinus cynocephalus, the Tasmanian tiger, both of which existed on mainland Australia.

Taxonomy 
A species described by Adam Yates, published in 2015, emerging from a study of the left dentary of a thylacinid obtained at the Curramulka fossil site in South Australia. 
The holotype had been examined by Neville Pledge, who remarked on the possibility of a new species in 1992.

The specific epithet combines the name of the region it was discovered, the Yorke Peninsula, and the Latin , a diminutive suffix that denotes a species that was smaller than Thylacinus cynocephalus.

Description 

A comparatively small species of Thylacinus that is known to have existed during the late Miocene epoch. The author of the species suggests that evidence supports the species existing during that later Pliocene.
The holotype of the species, the dentary, retains the three premolars, two of four molars, the canine, and alveoli of the incisor and missing second molar. The specimen was broken at the third molar, so presents no evidence of the fourth.

An estimated weight for two known specimens, calculated with regression functions applied to dasyuromorphian data, is noted as 17.8 and 15.9 kilograms. The average body mass of T. cynocephalus was greater than this estimate, around 30 kg, and the species was much smaller than range of estimated weights, 38.7 to 57.3 kg, for Thylacinus potens and Thylacinus megiriani.

References 

Dasyuromorphs